Frej is the third , named after the Norse god Freyr. She was launched during late in 1974, and on 30 September 1975 she was delivered to the Swedish Navy and departed the shipyard bound for Stockholm.

References 
 Staffan Fischerström, ''Isbrytare
 Owners site

External links
 

Ships built in Helsinki
Icebreakers of Sweden
1974 ships
Atle-class icebreakers